Goerdeler or Gördeler is a German family name. It may refer to:
 Carl Friedrich Goerdeler (1884–1945), mayor of Leipzig and participant in the 20 July plot against Hitler
 Fritz Goerdeler (1886–1945), his younger brother
 Reinhard Goerdeler (1922–1996), Carl Friedrich's son
 8268 Goerdeler, an asteroid named after Carl Friedrich